Busby Marou (pronounced buz-bee ma-roo) are an Australian musical duo originally from Rockhampton, Queensland. The duo consists of Thomas Busby and Jeremy Marou while other musicians perform with them in concert. At the APRA Music Awards of 2012, the duo won "Blues & Roots Work of the Year" category.

History

2007-2012: Career Beginnings and Busby Marou

In 2007, Thomas Busby and Jeremy Marou met in Rockhampton. Jeremy is of Torres Strait Islander heritage, and both performers come from musical families. With similar musical interests, the two combined to perform and write music under the name Busby Marou.

Busby Marou's debut EP, The Blue Road, was recorded at Pete Murray's personal studios in Byron Bay and produced by Anthony Lycenko who had worked with artists such as Murray, David Bowie and Shifter. The EP had a limited release. Busby Marou supported Pete Murray during the Toowoomba leg of his 2008 Australian Tour.

In 2009 saw the duo as one of five successful applicants for "Breakthrough" – A Federal Government initiative supporting emerging indigenous contemporary musicians. The award assisted in the production of the band's debut, self-titled album, which was released in August 2010. In September 2010 at the Deadly Awards 2010 Busby Marou won the award for "Most Promising New Talent".

Late in 2010, Busby Marou featured on the He Will Have His Way – Finn Brothers Tribute Album. The album went Gold within a month of release. Their contribution was a cover of "Better Be Home Soon". On 12 February 2011, Busby Marou performed at the Rugby League All Stars match at the Gold Coast.

In 2011, Busby Marou were signed to Warner Music Australia's indie imprint, Footstomp Records, and in June 2011, re-released their debut, self-titled album.

2013-present: Farewell Fitzroy and Postcards from the Shell House

In October 2013, Busby Marou released their second studio album, Farewell Fitzroy which debuted at number 5 on the ARIA charts.
In May and June 2014, the duo supported James Blunt for the Australian leg of his Moon Landing World Tour. In October 2014, "Days of Gold" became their first charting single, debuting at 82.

In February 2017, Busby Marou released their third studio album, Postcards from the Shell House, which debuted at number 1 on the ARIA Albums Chart.

In October 2020, the band performed at the 2020 AFL Grand Final.

Influences
Their musical influences include elements of Crowded House, Elvis Presley, Pearl Jam and Willie Nelson.

Discography

Albums

Extended plays

Singles

Awards and nominations

AIR Awards
The Australian Independent Record Awards (commonly known informally as AIR Awards) is an annual awards night to recognise, promote and celebrate the success of Australia's Independent Music sector.

|-
| rowspan="2"| AIR Awards of 2011
| themselves  
| Breakthrough Independent Artist
| 
|-
| Busby Marou  
| Best Independent Blues and Roots Album
| 
|-

APRA Awards
The APRA Awards are presented annually from 1982 by the Australasian Performing Right Association (APRA), "honouring composers and songwriters".

|-
| 2012 || "Biding My Time" (Thomas Busby, Jeremy Marou) || Blues & Roots Work of the Year || 
|-
| rowspan="2"| 2014 || "Get You out of Here" (Thomas Busby, Jeremy Marou) || Blues & Roots Work of the Year || 
|-
| "Luck" (Thomas Busby, Don Walker) || Blues & Roots Work of the Year || 
|-
| rowspan="2"| 2018 || "Best Part of Me" (Thomas Busby, Jeremy Marou, Jon Hume) || Blues & Roots Work of the Year || 
|-
| "Getaway Car" (Thomas Busby, Jeremy Marou, David Ryan Harris) || Blues & Roots Work of the Year || 
|-
| 2020 || "Sound of Summer" || Most Performed Blues & Roots Work of the Year || 
|-
| 2021 ||"Over Drinking Over You" || Most Performed Blues & Roots Work || 
|-

ARIA Music Awards
The ARIA Music Awards is an annual awards ceremony that recognises excellence, innovation, and achievement across all genres of Australian music. Busby Marou have been nominated for three awards.

|-
| 2014
| "My Second Mistake" (directed by Renny Wijeyamohan)
| Best Video
| 
|-
| 2017
| Postcards from the Shell House
| Best Blues and Roots Album
| 
|-
| 2020
| The Great Divide
| Best Blues and Roots Album
| 
|-

Country Music Awards of Australia
The Country Music Awards of Australia is an annual awards night held in January during the Tamworth Country Music Festival. Celebrating recording excellence in the Australian country music industry. They commenced in 1973.

! 
|-
|rowspan="2"| 2020 || The Great Divide || Contemporary Country Album of the Year ||  ||rowspan="2"| 
|-
| Busby Marou || Group or Duo of the Year ||

Gold Coast Music Awards 
The Gold Coast Music Awards are an annual awards ceremony that recognises musicians from the Gold Coast area.

|-
| 2020
| "The Great Divide"
| Release of the year
| 
|-

National Indigenous Music Awards
The National Indigenous Music Awards recognise excellence, innovation and leadership among Aboriginal and Torres Strait Islander musicians from throughout Australia. They commenced in 2004.

|-
| rowspan="3"| 2012
| themselves
| Artist of the Year
| 
|-
| Busby Marou
| Album of the Year
| 
|-
| 
| Song of the Year
| 
|-
| rowspan="3"| 2014
| Farewell Fitzroy
| Album of the Year
| 
|-
| "My Second Mistake"
| rowspan="2"| Song of the Year
| 
|-
| "Get You Out of Here"
| 
|-
| 2017
| Postcards from the Shell House
| Album of the Year
| 
|-
| 2018
| "Days of Gold"
| Song of the Year
| 
|-

Q Song Awards
The Queensland Music Awards (previously known as Q Song Awards) are annual awards celebrating Queensland, Australia's brightest emerging artists and established legends. They commenced in 2006.

 (wins only)
|-
| 2010
| "Paint My Cup"
| Indigenous Song of the Year  
| 
|-
| 2020
| "Naba Norem (The Reef Song)"
| Blues and Roots Song of the Year  
| 
|}

References

External links
Busby Marou website
Busby Marou on National Indigenous Television

APRA Award winners
Australian rock music groups
Queensland musical groups
Musical groups established in 2007